Cosker is a surname. Notable people with the surname include:

Dean Cosker (born 1978), English cricketer
John Cosker, American boat builder

See also
McCosker